Ephraim Mogale Local Municipality (until 28 January 2010 named Greater Marble Hall Local Municipality) is located in the Sekhukhune District Municipality of Limpopo province, South Africa. The seat of Ephraim Mogale Local Municipality is Marble Hall.

History
The municipality was named after Ephraim Phumuga Mogale, a South African freedom fighter.

Main places
The 2001 census divided the municipality into the following main places:

Politics 
The municipal council consists of thirty-two members elected by mixed-member proportional representation. Sixteen councillors are elected by first-past-the-post voting in sixteen wards, while the remaining sixteen are chosen from party lists so that the total number of party representatives is proportional to the number of votes received. In the election of 3 August 2016, the African National Congress (ANC) won a majority of twenty seats on the council.

The following table shows the results of the election.

Sports
Local sports teams in Ephraim Mogale Local Municipality include FC Maginim Ephraim Mogale, a football club.

References

External links 
 

Local municipalities of the Sekhukhune District Municipality